Jean-François Rivière (born 28 February 1977) is a retired French footballer who played as a striker. His previous clubs include Chamois Niortais, Stade Lavallois, Amiens SC, Besançon RC, AC Ajaccio, Clermont Foot, and Gazélec Ajaccio.

Career
In January 2013, Rivière joined Gazélec Ajaccio.

References

1977 births
Living people
Association football forwards
French footballers
Stade Lavallois players
Amiens SC players
Racing Besançon players
Chamois Niortais F.C. players
Angers SCO players
AC Ajaccio players
Clermont Foot players
Gazélec Ajaccio players
Ligue 2 players